Robert Wroth may refer to:
 Robert Wroth (Middlesex MP) (1540–1606), English politician who was a member of 10 parliaments between 1563 and 1606
 Robert Wroth (died 1614), English MP for Newtown, IoW, 1601 and Middlesex, 1604, husband of Lady Mary Wroth.
 Robert Wroth (Guildford MP) (1660–1720), English MP